{{Infobox PolishCoA|
         herb=Nowina|
        image=Herb Nowina.jpg|
    battlecry=Złotogoleńczyk|
  alternative=Nowiny, Nowińczyk, Wojnia, Zawiasa, Złotogoleńczyk|
      mention=1293 CE|
     families=157 names as of c.2005 A.D(this list is unedited so there may be a few more) : Axt, Bagnar, Banczalski, Bandoszewski, Barycki, Baynarowicz, Bejnar, Bejnarowicz, Bejner,  Białkowski, Bochner, Bochrier, Bodzanek, Bogusławski, Borkowski, Boruta, Boynar, Boznański, Brzączewski, Brzoska, Bulewicz, Byk, Bylinar, Bzowski, Cewowski, Cholejewski, Cholejowski, Chrzanowski, Chrząstowski, Chwalibóg, Czerny, Daćkiewicz, Dalewski, Dobroszewski, Dobrowolski, Dominowski, Druszkowski, Dubasowski, Dulowski, Dworzycki, Dziwlewski, Elbowicz, Enochowicz, Falibowski, Frącewicz, Frincewicz, Frykacz, Gabryszewski, Gałąskowski, Garbowiecki, Garczyński, Giebułtowski, Gissowski, Giszowski, Gizowski, Giżewski, Glasenapp, Glezmierski, Glinka, Gliński, Glizmiński, Gliźmiński, Goczał, Goczałkowski, Gomor, Gośniewski, Grajowski, Gumicki, Gumowicz, Haniewicz, Harasimowicz, Hołdyszowicz, Hulewicz, Ignatowski, Ikmanowski, Jakunowski, Janikowski, Jankowski, Janota, Jelnicki, Jenota, Jezierski, Jeziorski, Kazigordzki, Kędzierzawski, Klimaszewski, Koczmycki, Konarski, Konopacki, Konopka, Konopkowski, Koraczycki, Koropolański, Koseper, Kosla, Koslicki, Kosmycki, Koszmyczski, Kośla, Koślicki, Kowalewski, Koziełło, Kozioł, Kozłowicz, Koźla, Koźmicki, Koźnicki, Krasuski, Krokwicki, Krowicki, Krysztoporski, Krzępowski, Krzysztoforski, Krzysztoporski, Kuflewski, Kuflowski, Kurowicki, Kwassowski, Kwiatkowski, Labeński, Lasotowski, Legawski, Lestwicz, Lissowski, Łabeński, Łabęcki, Ładnowski, Łaganowski, Łękawski, Łośniewski, Łucewicz, Łuczycki, Łysak, Macharzyński, Macherzyński, Maczanowicz, Mantul, Marski, Marzecki, Masiński, Masłoniecki, Maszeński, Maszewski, Maszycki, Maszyński, Mecherzyński, Mełwieński, Mełwiński, Mielżyński, Minocki, Mizgier, Młoszewski, Młoszowski, Mninowski, Moczydłowski, Mościcki, Mrozowski, Mściwojewski, Mściwujewski, Nabora, Naborowski, Nadbor, Nadbora, Naramski, Narembski, Narębski, Nargiełło, Nargieło, Nasuticz, Nasutowicz, Niewiadomski, Niewieski, Nowakowski, Nowaliński, Nowiński, Nowokrzycki, Nowoszycki, Ochocki, Oknicki, Olbierowski, Olbierz, Olbierzowski, Orlicki, Oriesek, Owczarski, Padniewski, Pasiński, Paszyński, Paziński, Perekałski, Perepecza, Pielat, Piestrzecki, Pilat, Pilatowski, Pilchowski, Pilichowski, Piłat, Pitkowski, Pitowski, Pochocki, Podegimski, Popowski, Prądzewski, Przanowski, Przerembski, Przerębski, Przesiecki, Przonowski, Przybylski, Przysiecki, Purwiński, Pytkowski, Pytowski, Radło, Raduski, Rampkowski, Rampowski, Redzi, Rożnowski, Rożnowski de Skoki, Rwieński, Ryszkowski, Rzwieński, Sankowski, Sapiński, Saryński, Sawinicz, Sąpieński, Schocki, Schodzki, Sewalla, Sępiński, Sępowicz, Sitko, Skocki, Skowzgird, Slachciński, Sładkowski, Słodzki, Słomiński, Smagłowski, Sobonowski, Sokolnicki, Spokojski, Sroczycki, Sroczyński, Stępowicz, Sworcz, Szaracki, Szczygielski, Szlachcicki, Szlachciński, Szlachta, Szupiński, Szwarc, Szytko, Ślachciński, Świątecki, Świerznia, Świrczyna, Świrczyński, Tomecki, Ujadzki, Ujazdski, Ujejski, Uła, Wandrycz, Watowski, Wieski, Wilkowski, Witkowski, Wojecki, Wojutyński, Wycieszewski, Wydzierzewski, Wydzierzowski, Wygierżewski, Załuski, Zarczycki, Zarzycki, Zasczyński, Zaszczyński, Zimnowski, Złotnicki, Zwęcki, Żarcicki, Żarczycki, Żeromski|        towns=Trzydnik Duzy|}}
Nowina is a Polish coat of arms. It was used by several szlachta families in the times of the Polish–Lithuanian Commonwealth. The original clan consisted of only 24 families.

History

Nowina is one of the oldest Polish heraldic marks with claims that it existed prior to 960 CE. However, the earliest known depiction was on a seal of Nacislaw of Dobrosolow of the Nowina clan in 1293 CE. It was first mentioned in a court registry of 1392 and spread across the families of Greater Poland and the lands of Kraków, Lublin, Sandomierz and Sieradz. After the Union of Horodło of 1413 CE several boyar families  adopted this coat of arms. The representative of the Nowina clan adopted'' the nobility of Lithuanian descent was Mikołaj of Sepno, while the newcomers were represented by Mikołaj Bejnar.

Blazon

Azure, a cauldron's handle Argent, with both ends upwards. Between them a cross or a sword proper, with the handle upwards. Out of the crest coronet an armoured leg bent in the knee as if  kneeling. Foot directed leftwards.

Notable bearers
 Hetman Fylyp Orlyk (1672–1742), secretary and close associate of Hetman Ivan Mazepa, diplomat, Hetman of Zaporizhian Host in exile
 Hryhoriy Orlyk (1702–1759), Ukrainian-born French military commander, special envoy and member of Louis XV's secret intelligence service
 Jan Przerębski (?–1523), castellan of Sieradz
 Jan Przerębski (1519–1562), Crown chancellor, secretary of the Crown, royal secretary, nominee for the bishopric of Chełm
 Jerzy Krasuski (1930–2009), historian, specializing in the history of the nineteenth and twentieth centuries
 Anton Luckievič (1884-1942), Prime Minister and Minister of Foreign Affairs of the Belarusian Democratic Republic
 Marcin Szlachciński (1511/1512–?), scholar, translator, poet, philosopher and professor at the Jagiellonian University
 Marian Przysiecki (1905–1943), economist, agronomist, officer of the Home Army
 Michał Jankowski (1842–1912), pioneer of the Russian Far East, naturalist and breeder
 Mikołaj Złotnicki (?–1694), cup-bearer to John III Sobieski
 Olga Boznańska (1865–1940), painter, portraitist and representative of Modernism
 Stanisław Brzóska (1832–1865), priest, general, one of leaders of the Polish insurgency and the last partisan of the January Uprising
 Devil Boruta - fictional character, a devil from Polish folklore

See also
 Polish heraldry
 Heraldry
 Coat of arms

References

External links 
  
  

Nowina